Mahbubul Alam is a former advisor of the Caretaker Government of Bangladesh and editor of The Independent.

Career
Alam was the Information Advisor in the Caretaker government led by President Iajuddin Ahmed from 2006 to 2007. He served as the editor of The Independent.

References

Living people
Advisors of Caretaker Government of Bangladesh
Bangladeshi journalists
Year of birth missing (living people)